Anthony Corley (born August 10, 1960) is an American former professional football running back who spend two seasons in the National Football League with the Pittsburgh Steelers in 1984 and the San Diego Chargers in 1985, appearing in a total of 18 career games.

References

External links
Anthony Corley's career stat at NFL.com

Living people
1960 births
Players of American football from Nevada
Pittsburgh Steelers players
San Diego Chargers players
American football running backs
UNLV Rebels football players